Svet je moj (trans. The World Is Mine) is the second studio album from Serbian rock band Van Gogh, released in 1991. Svet je moj is the first Van Gogh album released after their 1990 reunion.

Track listing
All songs were written by Zvonimir Đukić, except where noted.
"Dibuk" – 3:43
"Neko te ima" (Z. Đukić, G. Milisavljević) – 3:41
"Svet je moj" (Z. Đukić, G. Milisavljević) – 2:36
"Gubiš me" – 3:25
"Smeh na usnama" – 3:10
"Policija" - 2:51
"Linija" – 4:09
"Glas" – 3:11
"Ima li ljubavi" – 3:12
"Srce" – 3:00
"Daleki svet" (Z. Đukić, G. Milisavljević) – 3:32

Personnel
Zvonimir Đukić - guitar, vocals
Aleksandar Barać - bass guitar
Vladan Cvetković - drums
Vladimir Barjaktarević - keyboards, producer

Legacy
The song "Neko te ima" was polled in 2000 as 6th on Rock Express Top 100 Yugoslav Rock Songs of All Times list. In 2011, the same song was voted, by the listeners of Radio 202, one of 60 greatest songs released by PGP-RTB/PGP-RTS during the sixty years of the label's existence.

References

Svet je moj at Discogs
 EX YU ROCK enciklopedija 1960-2006,  Janjatović Petar;

External links
Svet je moj at Discogs

Van Gogh (band) albums
1991 albums
PGP-RTB albums
Alternative rock albums by Serbian artists